The Embassy of Sweden in Berlin is Sweden's diplomatic mission in Germany. Ambassador since 2017 is Per Thöresson. Sweden established a legation in Berlin in 1912. During World War II, it was destroyed in aerial bombings and the legation was moved to other addresses in Berlin. After the war, the Swedish legation moved to Cologne in West Germany, and in the mid-1950s to Bonn, where it remained until 1999. During the Cold War, Sweden also had an embassy in East Berlin from the 1970s onwards. In 1999, the new Swedish embassy in Berlin was inaugurated and the one in Bonn was closed. The building complex in which the Swedish embassy is located since 1999 is called Nordic Embassies.

History

1910s–1940s
Until the turn of the century in 1900, Sweden's foreign representation had only one own building and it was the Swedish Palace in Constantinople where the envoy for the Sublime Porte resided. The Swedish legation in Berlin became the fourth to reside in its own house (after Paris in 1900, Madrid in 1904 and Kristiania in 1906). In 1912, the legation house in Berlin was purchased by the Swedish state through Consul General Rudolf von Koch for SEK 530,000. The address was Tiergartenstraße 36 and the house was on the corner of Friedrich-Wilhelm-Straße, now Klingelhöferstraße. The house was built in 1880 and was transformed by architect Fredrik Lilljekvist into a baroque pastiche whose facade was crowned by the Swedish coat of arms. Already in the early 1920s, the legation house became too crowded and there were long negotiations to buy the neighboring villa, which was much larger. The deal went awry and instead they had to buy a 10 meter wide strip of land from the neighboring plot to at least prevent the back of the legation building from being obscured if a larger house was built on the site. The villa was finally bought by the Finnish state for the republic's legation.

World War II
Under Hitler's Germany, the legation house was in danger of being demolished because Tiergartenstraße was to be widened and also partly moved to make way for a huge new building for the Oberkommando der Wehrmacht. In addition, the house was already too crowded. Therefore, it was decided that the city of Berlin would expropriate two properties – Tiergartenstraße 46-47 – and build a new Swedish embassy building on the site as a replacement for the old one. The Swedish state took over the two properties in 1940–41, as well as another one – Tiergartenstraße 45 – for a future construction. While waiting for the war to end, the existing houses were used.

During the bombing of Berlin on 22 November 1943, the Swedish legation was completely destroyed and burned to the ground. Only the newly built bunker in the legation garden was undamaged. It was then moved to Rauchstraße 25 in Tiergarten, with postal address Altdöbern, Kreis Calan. After the bombing, the bulk of the legation was evacuated to Alt-Döbern, a castle about 120 km southwest of Berlin that Minister Arvid Richert had rented in August 1943 in the face of the threat of the aerial bombing campaign. The embassy's premises were now unusable and legation were allowed to rent a house at Rauchstraße 23 for the Berlin chancery. Most of the tasks were handled in Alt-Döbern. At the beginning of April 1945, the Federal Foreign Office was evacuated to Bad Gastein and the foreign missions were offered to accompany, with the Swedish legation choosing to stay in Berlin to protect Swedish lifes and Swedish property. The reason was that there were a relatively large number of Swedish citizens in the city, who did not want or could not take refuge in Sweden.

During the last days of the final battle, the artillery fire was so intense that the legation staff were practically trapped in their bunker. On 1 May 1945, the bunker was occupied by about fifteen Russians. The operation of the legation continued even after the arrival of the Russians, despite the Wehrmacht capitulating on 8 May 1945 and the Nazi Germany ceased to exist and Sweden declared that diplomatic relations had been broken. On 18 May, however, the legation staff was evacuated via Moscow and Leningrad to Stockholm.

Cold War

Berlin
The management of the properties in Berlin was taken over by the British occupying power, which managed it until 1948 when the properties were returned to Sweden. Of the four buildings, the legation house at Tiergartenstraße 36 was best preserved to the extent that the outer walls remained. The other houses had almost been destroyed in the bombing in November 1943 and were only ruin mounds that were cleared away in 1952. Before the Interbau exhibition in Berlin in 1957, the city was concerned that the old diplomatic quarters would be rebuilt and already in 1953 there were plans to rebuild the Swedish legation house and use the preserved outer walls. This never happened and instead the ruin was demolished in 1956.

In 1964, a house (built in 1940) was purchased by the Swedish state in the Dahlem district for use as a residence. Here, secret East-West talks were held in the garden in 1966 between Berlin Mayor Willy Brandt and Soviet Ambassador Pyotr Abrassimov. The talks were mediated by the then consul general Sven Backlund and became the first steps on the road to Brandt's famous Ostpolitik.

In 1970, the National Board of Public Building (Byggnadsstyrelsen) paid for a general overhaul of the legation plots and the old air defense room. West Germany was formed in September 1949 by the Western Allied occupying powers, and in October of that year, the Soviet Union responded by transforming its area of occupation into its own state – East Germany. Sweden established diplomatic relations with the West Germany with mission in the provisional capital Bonn. As Sweden did not recognize a divided Germany and East Germany, the legation site in Berlin was retained pending reunification and that Berlin would once again become the capital. However, the two German states recognized each others in 1972 and this was followed by a Swedish recognition of East Germany and a Swedish embassy in East Berlin. In the mid-1970s, the address of the Swedish embassy in East Berlin was Otto-Grotewohl-Straße 3 A.

Cologne/Bonn
After the war, the embassy moved to a rented villa at Ulmenallée 96 in Bayenthal, Cologne and Sweden was then represented in Germany with a diplomatic representative accredited to the Allied High Commission. The villa contained 18 rooms distributed on the basement floor with kitchen area and caretaker's home, two residential floors and a partially furnished attic. The villa served as the chancellery from December 1949 at the latest, when it was first accredited. The ambassador's residence was at Ulmenallée 152. The villa at Ulmenallée 96 was bought by the Swedish state in 1951 for DM 115,000, (SEK 140,000). In 1954, the chancery was still located at Ulmenallée 96 in Cologne but the Trade Department was located at Gerhard von Arestraße 1 in Bonn. In 1956, the Swedish legation was converted into an embassy, which was based at this location with its consular department until 1957. In 1957 it moved to Koblenzer Straße 91 in Bonn and the villa at Ulmenallée 96 was sold. In the mid-1960s, the chancellery was still located at Koblenzer Straße 91 in Bonn and the residence was located at Friedrich-Schmidt-Straße 60 in Cologne. By 1968, the embassy had moved to another location in Bonn, to Allianzplatz Haus I at An der Heussallee 2-10, in an area also called Tulpenfeld and the residence was now located at Dietkirchener Hof (also called Alter Fronhof) in Urfeld, a district of the city of Wesseling, where it took over the residence of the Dutch ambassador. The residence remained there until 7 June 1999.

Post-Cold War
It no longer seemed probable that the old plots in West Berlin would be used for a Swedish representation. Sweden therefore sold the four legation properties to the city of Berlin in 1974. After the reunification, there were plans for a new government center in the capital and at Spree the old idea was to gather the foreign embassies at Tiergartenstraße and both the city of Berlin and the Federal Republic were happy to see Sweden and Finland return to their old plots. Sweden therefore began negotiations with the city of Berlin to buy back the old legation site and in June 1995, the Swedish state took over the property Tiergartenstraße 36 again.

In September 1999, the Nordic Embassies was inaugurated, where the Swedish embassy lies side by side with other Nordic embassies: Norway, Denmark, Finland and Iceland. The common house and plot are owned by the Nordic countries together, while the embassy buildings are owned by each country. The Austrian architects Alfred Berger and Tiina Parkkinen won an international architectural competition on how the acquired plot would be used with the proposal to let the embassy complexes be held together by a copper band that encloses two sides of the triangular block. Common denominators were also that all houses would have four storeys, flat roofs and facade directions that continue into the neighboring building. Five developers, seven architectural firms and thirty-five contractors had been active on the same site in a cohesive project. After an architectural competition, it was Gert Wingårdh and Wingårdh arkitektkontor who were entrusted to design the Swedish embassy.

Heads of mission

Footnotes

References

External links

Berlin
Germany–Sweden relations
Sweden